Liu He (died 310), courtesy name Xuantai, was for seven days an emperor of the Xiongnu-led Chinese Han Zhao dynasty in 310.

Life
Liu He was the founding emperor Liu Yuan (Emperor Guangwen)'s son, likely oldest son, by his first wife Empress Huyan.  According to the Book of Jin, Liu He was described as having an imposing, handsome and sturdy look, and was about 1.96 meters tall. he was studious, but suspicious and miserly.  Liu He was created the Prince of Liang (梁王), a title that he was posthumously known by as well, in 308.  In early 310, Liu Yuan created him crown prince.

Before Liu Yuan died later in 310, he commissioned his sons and Liu He's brothers Liu Yu (劉裕) the Prince of Qi, Liu Long (劉隆) the Prince of Lu, and Liu Ai (劉乂) the Prince of Beihai with substantial troops at the capital, in addition to the large army that another son, Liu Cong the Prince of Chu, already had, with intent that they assist him with governance and military matters.  A group of officials, both Xiongnu and Chinese, were given various responsibilities in assisting Liu He.  However, three officials were left out—Liu He's uncle Huyan You (呼延攸), Liu Cheng (劉乘) -- who had prior grudges with Liu Cong—and Liu Rui (劉銳) the Prince of Xichang.  They were disgruntled, and they persuaded the already suspicious Liu He that he could not be safe if his brothers maintained large forces in or near the capital.  Three days after Liu Yuan's death, under Liu He's orders, these officials commenced surprise attacks on Liu He's four brothers—Liu Rui against Liu Chong, Huyan You against Liu Yu, Liu Cheng against Liu Long, and Tian Mi (田密) and Liu Gui (劉璿) against Liu Ai.  Once Tian and Liu Gui got on the way, however, they did not attack Liu Ai but instead escorted him to alert Liu Cong, who then prepared for the confrontation.  Liu Rui withdrew his troops.  Over the next two days, Liu Yu and Liu Long were defeated and killed.  Two days later, Liu Cong besieged the palace and killed Liu He, Liu Cheng, Liu Rui, and Huyan.  After initially offering the throne to Liu Ai, Liu Cong then assumed the throne himself.

References

4th-century Chinese monarchs
Former Zhao emperors
310 deaths
Year of birth unknown
Murdered Chinese emperors